Wilton is a town in Monroe County, Wisconsin, United States. The population was 925 at the 2000 census. The Village of Wilton is located partially within the town.

Geography

Demographics
At the 2000 census, there were 925 people in 238 households, including 211 families, in the town. The racial make-up of the town was 99.35% White, 0.54% Asian and 0.11% from two or more races. None of the population were Hispanic or Latino of any race. Of the 238 households, 47.1% had children under the age of 18 living with them, 78.6% were married couples living together, 5.5% had a female householder with no husband present, and 11.3% were non-families. 8.4% of households were one person and 3.4% were one person aged 65 or older. The average household size was 3.89 and the average family size was 4.14.

The age distribution was 42.9% under the age of 18, 7.8% from 18 to 24, 26.1% from 25 to 44, 14.7% from 45 to 64 and 8.5% 65 or older. The median age was 24 years. For every 100 females, there were 112.2 males. For every 100 females age 18 and over, there were 111.2 males.

The median household income was $27,917 and the median family income was $29,625. Males had a median income of $20,893 and females $20,227. The per capita income was $10,498.  About 31.2% of families and 45.6% of the population were below the poverty line, including 69.6% of those under age 18 and 11.5% of those age 65 or over.

References

Towns in Monroe County, Wisconsin
Towns in Wisconsin